Killin Junction was a railway station located in Glen Dochart, Stirling (district) close to where the road from Glen Ogle joins the Crianlarich to Killin road.

History 
Killin Junction station opened on 1 June 1870, providing passengers on the Callander and Oban Railway with a connection to Killin by the newly opened Killin Railway.

The station was situated in the woodlands on the slopes leading up to Glen Ogle pass and, apart from the railway, could be reached by footpath only.

The station was closed on 27 September 1965 following a landslide in Glen Ogle. Nowadays a forestry road following the track of the old line to Killin leads from the A85 to the location. There are still traces of the platforms, a few derelict former railway houses and the line to Glen Ogle, which can be followed for some distance, although fallen trees after a recent storm block the track in places. All signal boxes and other buildings are gone.

References

Notes

Sources

External links 
 Killin Junction station on navigable 1925 map

Disused railway stations in Stirling (council area)
Beeching closures in Scotland
Railway stations in Great Britain opened in 1870
Railway stations in Great Britain closed in 1965
Former Caledonian Railway stations